Cuervo is a surname.

Cuervo may also refer to:
Cuervo, New Mexico
Jose Cuervo, a brand of tequila

See also
El Cuervo (disambiguation)

Corvo (disambiguation)
Corvus (disambiguation)